Trappe (Pennsylvania German: Drapp) is a borough in Montgomery County, Pennsylvania, United States. The population was 3,509 at the 2010 census.  Augustus Lutheran Church, built in 1743, is the oldest unchanged Lutheran church building in the United States in continuous use by the same congregation.  It has been designated a National Historic Landmark.

Geography
Trappe is located at  (40.197111, -75.475244).

Schools
Trappe falls within the boundaries of the Perkiomen Valley School District.  South Elementary school lies in the borough, as does the old Collegeville-Trappe high school.

History
European settlers arrived in the area of Trappe in the early 18th century and included many German immigrants.  They had landed at the port of Philadelphia and moved west, where land was available.

One of the oldest extant buildings in town is Augustus Lutheran Church. Construction of the old church began in 1743 following the arrival of Lutheran minister Henry Melchior Muhlenberg, who emigrated from Germany in 1742.  After a severe storm on February 16, 1860 that damaged the colonial building, it was saved and restored by his grandson William Augustus Muhlenberg.  It is the oldest unchanged Lutheran church building in the US in continuous use by the same congregation and has been designated a National Historic Landmark.

A c. 1830 building across from Augustus Lutheran Church served as the US Post Office until 1929, when operations were moved to a larger regional location.  The post office/general store is now a private residence.

Trappe is also home to the Henry Melchior Muhlenberg House, which is listed on the National Register of Historic Places. The building has been restored and is operated as a museum by the Historical Society of Trappe, Collegeville, Perkiomen Valley, Inc.

The Speaker's House, home of Frederick Muhlenberg, is another historic site in Trappe that is open to the public. It is currently undergoing restoration.

Transportation

The main highway serving Trappe is Pennsylvania Route 113. It traverses the borough on a general northeast-southwest alignment following Third Avenue. 

SEPTA provides Suburban Bus service to Trappe along Route 93, which runs between the Norristown Transportation Center in Norristown and Pottstown.

Demographics

As of the 2010 census, 89.2% White, 3.2% Black or African American, 0.3% Native American, 4.5% Asian, and 2.0% were two or more races. 2.7% of the population were of Hispanic or Latino ancestry.

As of the census of 2000, there were 3,210 people, 1,292 households, and 886 families residing in the borough. The population density was 1,547.1 people per square mile (598.7/km2). There were 1,351 housing units at an average density of 651.1 per square mile (252.0/km2). The racial makeup of the borough was 94.02% White, 2.40% African American, 0.22% Native American, 1.37% Asian, 0.34% from other races, and 1.65% from two or more races. Hispanic or Latino of any race were 1.18% of the population.

There were 1,292 households, out of which 32.8% had children under the age of 18 living with them, 60.0% were married couples living together, 6.3% had a female householder with no husband present, and 31.4% were non-families. 24.2% of all households were made up of individuals, and 4.9% had someone living alone who was 65 years of age or older. The average household size was 2.48 and the average family size was 3.00.

In the borough the population was spread out, with 24.7% under the age of 18, 4.5% from 18 to 24, 41.0% from 25 to 44, 19.8% from 45 to 64, and 10.0% who were 65 years of age or older. The median age was 35 years. For every 100 females there were 99.3 males. For every 100 females age 18 and over, there were 95.5 males.

The median income for a household in the borough was $67,500, and the median income for a family was $76,544. Males had a median income of $52,337 versus $37,212 for females. The per capita income for the borough was $31,281. About 0.6% of families and 0.8% of the population were below the poverty line, including none of those under the age of eighteen or sixty-five or over.

Politics and government
Trappe has a borough manager form of government with a mayor and a seven-member borough council.  The mayor is Matthew Wismer.  The current borough council members are Scott Martin(president), Mallory Perlin (vice-president), Stewart Strauss, Julie Bechtel, Theresa Pammer, Tara Hiley, and Dave Davis.

The borough is part of the Fourth Congressional District (represented by Rep. Madeleine Dean), the 146th State House District (represented by Rep. Joe Ciresi) and the 24th State Senate District (represented by Sen. Bob Mensch).

Education
Trappe is part of the Perkiomen Valley School District.

Residents are zoned to South Elementary School, Middle School East, and Perkiomen Valley High School.

Notable people
Trappe is the birthplace of Frederick Muhlenberg, US Congressman and the first Speaker of the United States House of Representatives.
Jimmy Pop from the comedy rock band, Bloodhound Gang
William Rudolph Smith (1787-1868), Pennsylvania State Representative and Senator, Attorney General of Wisconsin

References

External links

 Borough of Trappe

Populated places established in 1763
Boroughs in Montgomery County, Pennsylvania